Liyue may refer to:
Liyue, a fictional country in the video game Genshin Impact

People with the given name
Zhang Liyue, Chinese competitor in the 2002 Asian Taekwondo Championships
Zhu Liyue, a character in The Legend of Crazy Monk

See also
Li Yue, Chinese businessman
Li Yue (canoeist) (born 1993), Chinese canoeist
Liyue Tan, a maritime feature in the Spratly Islands